The Mayor of the North Dhaka  is the chief executive of the  Dhaka North City Corporation. The Mayor's office administers all city services, public property, most public agencies, and enforces all city and state laws within Dhaka city.

The Mayor's office is located in Nagar Bhaban; it has jurisdiction over all 54 wards of Dhaka North City..

List of officeholders

Political parties

Status

Elections

Election Result 2020

By-Election Result 2019

Election Result 2015

References

Government of Dhaka
 
Dhaka, North